Reaction Fireworks is a United Kingdom company that stages large-scale fireworks displays. It was founded in 1985. Formerly known as Alan Hillary Pyrotechnics, the name of the company was changed in 2007. Its main offices are in Consett, County Durham, England.

Awards
Reaction Fireworks were winners of the British Firework Championships in 2004 and were runners up at the Champion of Champions competition in 2006. In 2010 they won the British Firework Championships heats in Scotland and were Championship runners-up.  In 2014 Reaction Fireworks were heat winners at the British National Firework Championships in 2014 where they also were awarded the Innovation Award for creating a 3D firework flower effect.

Notable displays
 Production Managers for the Royal Fireworks for Prince Charles and Lady Diana Spencer in 1981.
 From Sydney Harbour Bridge on Australia Day in 1989 and 1991.
  From Humber Bridge for the 25th Anniversary celebrations in 2008.
 To mark the final visit of the QE2 to the River Clyde in 2008.
 For the BBC Proms in 2009.
 From the Middlesbrough Transporter Bridge for the Centenary celebrations in 2011.

Professional memberships and associations
Reaction Fireworks is a member of the British Pyrotechnists Association (BPA) and the Confederation of British Industry (CBI) Explosives Industry Group.

References

External links
 Reaction Fireworks

Pyrotechnics
1985 establishments in the United Kingdom
Companies established in 1985
Fireworks companies
Manufacturing companies of the United Kingdom
Companies based in County Durham